The  is a peninsula on Okinawa Island. It is bordered by Nakagusuku Bay to the south, Kin Bay to the north, and the Pacific Ocean to the east. The entire peninsula is part of Uruma City. Katsuren Castle is on the south-central part of the peninsula. The Kaichū Dōro is a road connecting the Katsuren Peninsula to Henza Island. Offshore, coral reefs are found.

United States military relating to the Katsuren Peninsula

Buckner Bay - White Beach Naval Port Facility is located on the Katsuren Peninsula. There once was a plan, the "White Beach Plan," to relocate United States Marine Corps Air Station Futenma to the White Beach Training Area. However, it was not effected.

Nearby islands

 The eight Yokatsu Islands, which include:
 Ikei Island
 Hamahiga Island
 Henza Island
 Minamiukibara Island
 Miyagi Island
 Tsuken Island
 Ukibara Island
 Yabuchi Island

Other peninsulas on Okinawa

 Chinen Peninsula
 Henoko Peninsula
 Motobu Peninsula
 Yomitan peninsula

See also

 Chinen Cape
 Yakena Straits Observatory

References

External links and references

 A google map
 One link
 A second link
 On the Yakena Straits Observatory
 A shot of the  Waitui Cut
 Noroga and Remnants of an Old Sugar Factory, on Katsuren Peninsula
 One Youtube, exploring the Katsuren Peninsula
 Island-hopping in the Katsuren Peninsula
 Searching for Waitui on the Katsuren Peninsula
 An article on the geology of Kasturen Peninsula
 More geology

Okinawa Prefecture
Tourist attractions in Okinawa Prefecture
Geography of Okinawa Prefecture
Peninsulas of Japan